Sarah M. Hook (born 1967) is a New Zealand immunology academic, and as of 2019 is a full professor at the University of Otago.

Academic career

After a 1995 PhD titled  'Cervine Interleukin-4'  at the University of Otago, Hook joined the staff, rising to full professor.

Selected works 
 Armstrong, David S., Sarah M. Hook, Kris M. Jamsen, Gillian M. Nixon, Rosemary Carzino, John B. Carlin, Colin F. Robertson, and Keith Grimwood. "Lower airway inflammation in infants with cystic fibrosis detected by newborn screening." Pediatric pulmonology 40, no. 6 (2005): 500–510.
 Rizwan, Shakila B., Ben J. Boyd, Thomas Rades, and Sarah Hook. "Bicontinuous cubic liquid crystals as sustained delivery systems for peptides and proteins." Expert opinion on drug delivery 7, no. 10 (2010): 1133–1144.
 Marsland, Benjamin J., Nicola L. Harris, Mali Camberis, Manfred Kopf, Sarah M. Hook, and Graham Le Gros. "Bystander suppression of allergic airway inflammation by lung resident memory CD8+ T cells." Proceedings of the National Academy of Sciences 101, no. 16 (2004): 6116–6121.
 Graf, Anja, Elisabeth Ablinger, Silvia Peters, Andreas Zimmer, Sarah Hook, and Thomas Rades. "Microemulsions containing lecithin and sugar-based surfactants: nanoparticle templates for delivery of proteins and peptides." International journal of pharmaceutics 350, no. 1-2 (2008): 351–360.

References

External links
 
 

Living people
New Zealand women academics
University of Otago alumni
Academic staff of the University of Otago
New Zealand immunologists
1967 births
Women immunologists
New Zealand women writers